Raymond le Roux (born 27 May 1950) is a South African cricketer. He played in 94 first-class and 18 List A matches from 1968/69 to 1988/89.

References

External links
 

1950 births
Living people
South African cricketers
Border cricketers
Free State cricketers
Cricketers from Bloemfontein